The following is a list of Tim and Eric Awesome Show, Great Job! episodes. Episodes in the first three seasons were all released two days earlier than their air dates on Adult Swim Video.

Series overview

Episodes

Season 1 (2007)

Season 2 (2007–08)

Season 3 (2008)

Season 4 (2009)
Sometimes referred to as "Season Quad".

Season 5 (2010)
Often referred to as "Season Cinco". This was also the first and only season of the series to be produced 16:9 high definition.

Specials

References

External links
 
 Tim and Eric.com

Episode Review at FlakMag
Review on KWUR 90.3 FM Blog
Tim and Eric on Tom Green Live
 Tim and Eric on Adult Swim UK

Tim & Eric
Lists of American comedy television series episodes